Nicolae Costin (1660–1712) was a Moldavian chronicler.

Works
Nicolae Costin was the author of several historical writings dealing with the Principality of Moldova:
 Ceasornicul domnilor 
 Cartea descălecatului de-ntâiu
 Letopiseţul Ţării Moldovei de la zidirea lumii până la 1601
 Cronica domniei lui Nicolae Mavrocordat (1709-1711)
 Opere (Ed. Junimea, Iaşi, 1976)
 Letopiseţul Ţării Moldovei de la zidirea lumii pînă la 1601 şi de la 1709 la 1711 (Ed. Junimea, Iaşi, 1976)
 Scrieri (Ed. Hyperion, Chişinău, 1990)

External links
 Secolul XVIII ÎN MOLDOVA

1660 births
1712 deaths
Romanian nobility
Early Modern Romanian writers
Moldavian and Wallachian chroniclers
17th-century Romanian people
18th-century Romanian people